Corluddy Castle is located in County Kilkenny close to the village of Carrigeen. 

According to O'Kelly it is "5-storey high is roofless but in a good state of preservation, the bottom arch showing traces of osier-rod work. It is on an open hillside east of the village and belonged to the Grants until confiscated during the Cromwellian conquest of Ireland.  Peter Grant chief of the family died 1510 and is buried in St. Canice's Cathedral."

References

Castles in County Kilkenny
Ruins in the Republic of Ireland